Korea at the 2010 Winter Olympics may refer to:

North Korea at the 2010 Winter Olympics
South Korea at the 2010 Winter Olympics